Wálter Taibo Martínez (7 March 1931 – 10 January 2021) was a Uruguayan football goalkeeper who played for Uruguay in the 1966 FIFA World Cup. He also played for C.A. Peñarol. In Argentina, he played for Huracán in 1959-60.

References

External links
 FIFA profile

1931 births
2021 deaths
Uruguayan footballers
Uruguay international footballers
Association football goalkeepers
Uruguayan Primera División players
Peñarol players
1966 FIFA World Cup players
Uruguayan football managers
Danubio F.C. managers